= Landscape-Portrait =

Public digital artwork in UK

As part of the Landscape-Portrait project a billboard art work was created. The project was a collaboration between Kevin Carter, Karin Coetzee and Media19. (2007) Image by Nick Oldham/Media19

Landscape-Portrait (2007) is a public digital artwork that has been touring around the UK since its launch in 2007. In 2007 public arts agency Forma commissioned the work as part of a series of public art works for the Dott Festival (Design Of The Times) Newcastle, UK.

This image is a screen shot of the Landscape-Portrait website, showing the geographical location of the video portrait on a Google map.

The image details the Landscape-Portrait website, currently playing Sonia's video portrait.

== Methodologies and practice ==
The artwork was conceived by Kevin Carter and produced by in association with Forma, SCAN, web designer Pete McDonagh and d|Lab at the University of Teesside and features collaborations with artists and practitioners across the UK. These included: Tony White, Diane Humphries, Craig Gilbert, Richard Jeffery, Steve Lewis, Helen Sloan, Media19 and Karin Coetzee.

Landscape-Portrait investigates how postcode demographics, as represented by the Acorn System might reinforce certain stereotypes of communities across the UK. The work hopes to promote a dialogue around the possible effects this practice entails, for example in around social service provision, types of commercial investment undertaken as well as personal decision making, all of which arguably exacerbates a reductive perception of person and place, potentially at odds with an experience on the ground. In response to the reductive methodology of demographics the work makes use of public art practices in combination with digital technologies to author a complimentary dataset, with which to critique a purely statistical understanding of person and place. Participants are interviewed online and offline using a standard questionnaire which is based on that used by the Census. The revised questionnaire employs a subjective reasoning as opposed to an objective one that used by the Census. For example, where the Census questionnaire asks how many people the recipient lives with, the Landscape-Portrait questionnaire asks “How do you get on living with the people in your house?”.

Kerry is asked the question: “How do you get on living with the people in your house?”

The resulting data - video, text, meta data, image - will be made available under a creative commons license, allowing it to be reused by other practitioners, aligning it to ideas about public arts relationship with use and legacy value. Landscape-Portrait is an example of a digital public artwork which derives from a practice which makes use of digital technologies and community focused public art practices.

== Defining a new practice: digital public/community art ==
Landscape-Portrait is an example of a digital public artwork which derives from a mixing of digital technologies and community focused public art practices. This practice although derived from Digital art or more accurately Digital Public arts, but might be better understood as digital community art. As such it is at an early stage of development, and invites further definition. Other works and artists that might be included in this discipline are Graham Harwood. This approach to the use of digital technologies within a public art practice is differentiated from other digital public art works, such as UnderScan (2005) by Raphael Lorenzo Hemmer whereby the audiences relationship with the work is mediated via a formal spatial method of interaction rather than as a result of a dialogical practice familiar to community based arts.

The work and its practice (methods and methodologies) have been presented at various conferences. These include Digital Engagement, Sheffield, 2010, Public Interfaces at Aarhus University, Denmark, 2011 and CCID 2011: The Second International Symposium on Culture, Creativity and Interaction Design held in Newcastle. An article about the work and the practice of digital public art has been published in a peer-reviewed journal and Dr Ann Light for Sheffield and Hallam University has written about the work Landscape-Portrait in Interactions magazine.
